Illegal Traffic is a 1938 American crime film directed by Louis King and written by Robert Yost, Lewis R. Foster and Stuart Anthony. The film stars J. Carrol Naish, Mary Carlisle, Robert Preston, Judith Barrett, Pierre Watkin, Buster Crabbe and George McKay. The film was released on November 4, 1938, by Paramount Pictures.

Plot

Cast

J. Carrol Naish as Lewis Zomar
Mary Carlisle as Carol Butler
Robert Preston as Charles Bent Martin
Judith Barrett as Marie Arden
Pierre Watkin as Jigger
Buster Crabbe as Steve 
George McKay as Frank 'Old Man' Butler
Richard Denning as Silk Patterson
Phil Warren as Dittmar 
Sheila Darcy as Mathilde
Dolores Casey as Mamie
Dennis Morgan as Cagey Miller 
John Hart as Davis
Regis Toomey as Windy
William B. Davidson as Dalton
Joseph Crehan as Chief Daley
Monte Blue as Captain Moran
Archie Twitchell as Duke
Morgan Conway as State's Attorney Ryan
Emory Parnell as Lieutenant

References

External links 
 

1938 films
American crime films
1938 crime films
Paramount Pictures films
Films directed by Louis King
American black-and-white films
1930s English-language films
1930s American films